Travis Rettenmaier and Simon Stadler were the defending champions but decided not to participate.
David Rice and Sean Thornley defeated Brydan Klein and Dane Propoggia 7–6(10–8), 6–2 in the final to win the title.

Seeds

Draw

Draw

References
 Main draw

Doubles